is a Japanese football player.

Playing career
Naoki Maeda joined to Shonan Bellmare in 2013. In 2015, he moved to Fukushima United FC.

Club statistics
Updated to 23 February 2020.

References

External links

Profile at Fukushima United FC

1996 births
Living people
Association football people from Kanagawa Prefecture
Japanese footballers
J3 League players
Japan Football League players
Shonan Bellmare players
Fukushima United FC players
Iwaki FC players
Angkor Tiger FC players
Expatriate footballers in Cambodia
Japanese expatriate sportspeople in Cambodia
Association football midfielders